Michael Hazel (born 12 December 1976) is an Australian sprinter. He competed in the men's 4 × 400 metres relay at the 2000 Summer Olympics.

References

External links
 

1976 births
Living people
Athletes (track and field) at the 2000 Summer Olympics
Australian male sprinters
Olympic athletes of Australia
Place of birth missing (living people)